Judith Silverthorne, née Judith Iles (born 11 March 1953) is a Canadian author specializing in children's literature, as well as nonfiction about historical Saskatchewan woodworkers and furniture makers, and an immigrant potter, Peter Rupchan.

Born in Regina, Saskatchewan, Silverthorne has written hundreds of newspaper and magazine
articles, and instructs creative writing classes. She is a former documentary producer and
president of the Saskatchewan Writer's Guild.

In 2015, Silverthorne published a book named Honouring the Buffalo aimed at preserving aboriginal culture. Written in English the book is accompanied by Cree translations and is adapted from one of Piapot Cree First Nation elder Ray Lavallee's oral stories.

Silverthorne lives in Regina, Saskatchewan where she teaches at the University of Regina.

Awards
Silverthorn has won three Saskatchewan Book Awards. In 1996, her book The Secret of Sentinel Rock won the Children's Literature Award and in 2003 she was awarded the same prize for Dinosaur Hideout. She also received the Publishing Award in 1995 for Waiting For The Light.

Selected bibliography 
 The Secret of the Stone Circle, Coteau Books, 2010,  or 
 Dinosaur Blackout, Coteau Books, 2008,  or 
 Dinosaur Stakeout, Coteau Books, 2006,  or 
 The Secret of the Stone House, Coteau Books, 2005,  or 
 Dinosaur Breakout, Coteau Books, 2004,  or 
 Dinosaur Hideout, Coteau Books, 2003,  or 
 The Secret of Sentinel Rock, Coteau Books, 1996,  or 
 Made in Saskatchewan: Peter Rupchan, Ukrainian Pioneer and Potter, Prairie Lily Cooperative, 1991, Reprint: Spiral Communications Inc., 2004, 
 Ingrained Legacy: Saskatchewan Pioneer Woodworkers, 1870–1930, Spiral Communications Inc., 2004,

References

External links

 Judith Silverthorne at the Canadian Society of Children's Authors, Illustrators, and Performers (CANSCAIP.org)
 
 

Living people
1953 births
Canadian children's writers
20th-century Canadian women writers
Writers from Regina, Saskatchewan
Canadian women children's writers
Canadian biographers
Women biographers
20th-century Canadian non-fiction writers
21st-century Canadian non-fiction writers
21st-century Canadian women writers
20th-century biographers
Canadian women non-fiction writers